Bika is a village in Shaheed Bhagat Singh Nagar district of Punjab State, India. The village is administrated by Sarpanch an elected representative of the village.

Demography 
As of 2011, Bika has a total number of 178 houses and population of 771 of which 363 include are males while 408 are females according to the report published by Census India in 2011. The literacy rate of Bika is 83.74%, higher than the state average of 75.84%. The population of children under the age of 6 years is 82 which is 10.64% of total population of Bika, and child sex ratio is approximately 640 as compared to Punjab state average of 846.

Most of the people are from Schedule Caste which constitutes 68.61% of total population in Bika. The town does not have any Schedule Tribe population so far.

As per the report published by Census India in 2011, 309 people were engaged in work activities out of the total population of Bika which includes 212 males and 97 females. According to census survey report 2011, 75.08% workers describe their work as main work and 24.92% workers are involved in Marginal activity providing livelihood for less than 6 months.

Education 
Amardeep Singh Shergill Memorial college Mukandpur and Sikh National College Banga are the nearest colleges.

List of schools nearby:
Sat Modern Public School, Mangat Dingrian
Guru Teg Bahadur Model School, Behram
Guru Ram Dass Public School, Cheta
Lovely Public School, Pathlawa

Transport 

See also 
List of villages in India

References

External links 
 Tourism of Punjab 
 Census of Punjab
 Locality Based PINCode

Villages in Shaheed Bhagat Singh Nagar district